Riligustilide is a nonsteroidal phytoprogestogen that is found in Ligusticum chuanxiong. It is a very weak agonist of the progesterone receptor (EC50 ≈ 81 μM). Another compound in the plant, 3,8-dihydrodiligustilide, is also a phytoprogestogen, but is almost 1,000-fold more potent in comparison (EC50 = 90 nM).

See also
 Kaempferol
 Tanaproget

References

Progestogens
Cyclobutanes
Lactones
Alkene derivatives
Spiro compounds